Kloss's leaf warbler (Phylloscopus ogilviegranti) is a leaf warbler found in Cambodia, China, Laos, Thailand, and Vietnam.  Its natural habitats are temperate forests, subtropical or tropical moist lowland forests, and subtropical or tropical moist montane forests.

Kloss's leaf warbler was formerly considered as a subspecies of Davison's leaf warbler. It was promoted to species status based on evidence from both molecular genetic and vocalization studies.

References

Kloss's leaf warbler
Birds of Central China
Birds of South China
Birds of Laos
Birds of Vietnam
Kloss's leaf warbler
Taxonomy articles created by Polbot